16 and Pregnant is an American reality television series that debuted on June 11, 2009, on MTV. It follows the stories of pregnant teenage girls in high school dealing with the hardships of teenage pregnancy. Each episode features a different teenage girl, with the episode typically beginning when she is  – 8 months into her pregnancy. The episode typically ends when the baby is a few months old. The series is produced in a documentary format, with an animation on notebook paper showing highlights during each episode preceding the commercial breaks. 16 and Pregnant has spawned three spin-off series: Teen Mom, Teen Mom 2 and Teen Mom 3. Each series follows the lives of four girls from their respective season of 16 and Pregnant as they navigate their first years of motherhood. Another spinoff, Teen Mom: Young and Pregnant, premiered in March, 2018.

Series overview

Episodes

Season 1 (2009)

Season 2 (2010–11)

Season 3 (2011)

Season 4 (2012)

Season 5 (2014)

Season 6 (2020–21)

References

16 and Pregnant episodes